Robert Eugene Jenson (May 11, 1931 – January 6, 2018) was a Republican politician from the U.S. state of Oregon. He served in the Oregon House of Representatives representing District 58, which encompassed Union County, Wallowa County, and portions of Umatilla County. District 58 included the cities Pendleton, La Grande, and Enterprise. Jenson served in the Oregon House since 1997 until 2015. At the time of his retirement, as the member with the most seniority, he held the honorary title of Dean of the House.

Early life and career
Jenson was born on a ranch in Omaha, Nebraska in 1931. He received a bachelor of science degree and master's degree in United States History from Montana State University. He served in the United States Air Force from 1950 to 1954 and then worked as an airport commissioner.

Jenson moved to eastern Oregon in 1967 and taught at Blue Mountain Community College for 26 years. He also taught high school for 4 years.

Political career
In 1996, Jenson ran as a Democrat  for the seat in the Oregon House of Representatives vacated by Chuck Norris, who did not seek re-election, defeating Republican Don Armstrong. In 1998, Jenson changed his party affiliation to Independent after becoming dischanted with what he considered extreme environmental positions of the Democratic Party. He was re-elected to the House as an Independent in 1998, and then a year later, became a Republican.

He was re-elected as a Republican in 2000, and won re-election to the House every two years until 2014, when he did not run for reelection.

Personal
Jenson and his wife Evelyn lived in Pendleton. They had four children. He died from cancer on January 6, 2018, at his home in Pendleton.

References

External links
 Legislative website
 Project VoteSmart biography

1931 births
2018 deaths
Members of the Oregon House of Representatives
Politicians from Omaha, Nebraska
Military personnel from Omaha, Nebraska
Montana State University alumni
Politicians from Pendleton, Oregon
Educators from Oregon
Oregon Democrats
Oregon Independents
Oregon Republicans
21st-century American politicians
United States Air Force airmen
Deaths from cancer in Oregon